was a town located in Soo District, Kagoshima Prefecture, Japan.

As of 2003, the town had an estimated population of 4,275 and the density of 48.06 persons per km². The total area was 88.95 km².

On January 1, 2006, Kihoku, along with the towns of Aira and Kushira (both from Kimotsuki District), was merged into the expanded city of Kanoya and no longer exists as an independent municipality.

External links
 Official website of Kanoya 

Dissolved municipalities of Kagoshima Prefecture